Vizcaya is a genus of planthoppers in the family Delphacidae.  It is the type genus of the subfamily Vizcayinae Asche, 1990; species have been found in southern India, Indo-China and Malesia.

Species
Fulgoromorpha Lists On the Web includes the following:
 Vizcaya adornata Asche, 1990
 Vizcaya aschei Liang, 2002
 Vizcaya bakeri Muir, 1917 – type species (locality Philippines)
 Vizcaya latifrons Liang, 2002
 Vizcaya lombokensis Liang, 2002
 Vizcaya longispinosa Liang, 2002
 Vizcaya orea Asche, 1990
 Vizcaya piccola Asche, 1990
 Vizcaya vindaloa Asche, 1990

References

External links

Auchenorrhyncha genera
Delphacidae
Hemiptera of Asia